The 1981 Iowa State Cyclones football team represented Iowa State University during the 1981 NCAA Division I-A football season.  They played their home games at Cyclone Stadium in Ames, Iowa. They participated as members of the Big Eight Conference.  The team was coached by head coach Donnie Duncan. The offensive coordinator was Mack Brown.

Schedule

References

Iowa State
Iowa State Cyclones football seasons
Iowa State Cyclones football